The Gauhati Medical College and Hospital, the second medical college to be established in Assam, is also a health care institution. It provides medical education at undergraduate, postgraduate and superspecialty levels.

History
Dr. John Berry White, MRCS, a British surgeon of the East India Company, was the pioneer to start health education and health care in Assam. He established a medical school known as 'Berry White Medical School' at Dibrugarh, Assam in 1898–99. The school was upgraded and on 3 November 1947 the Assam Medical College, Dibrugarh, was established and it stands as the first medical college in Assam.

With increasing demands for health care and health education, the need for more medical colleges in Assam was felt. The state government in 1959 headed by Mr. B.P. Chaliha, the Chief Minister of Assam, Mr. Fakaruddin Ali Ahmed, the Finance Minister, and Mr. RupNath Brahma as the Medical Minister of Assam decided to have a second medical college in Assam. On 7 November 1959 the state government set up a committee to go into the matter and submit their report.

After several rounds of discussions, the committee visited sites at Ulubari, Jalukbari, Chandmari and other areas of the city of Guwahati and also parts of Silchar. The committee submitted its report on 26 April 1960 stating that it was feasible to start the Gauhati Medical College from August 1960 in the vacant Ayurvedic College buildings and the Physical Education Training buildings at Jalukbari, Guwahati but no such place was immediately available at Silchar to start the Silchar Medical College. The committee recommended Ulubari for Gauhati Medical College and Ghungoor for Silchar Medical College to be the permanent sites.

So the state government started the colleges with preclinical classes in the vacant buildings of the Ayurvedic College at Jalukbari, Guwahati with 60 students for Gauhati Medical College and 40 students for Silchar Medical College as a twin college. By a state government order no. MM-D/275/60/45 dated 26 June 1960, Dr. S.N. Sarma, the Principal and Supdt. of the Assam and Supdt. of the Assam Medical College & Hospital, Dibrugarh was entrusted with starting the preclinical classes at Jalukbari from August 1960 and with starting medical colleges at Gauhati and Silchar in addition to his duties in the AMC, Dibrugarh.

Accordingly, the vacant Ayurvedic College buildings at Jalukbari were taken over and arrangements were started by August 1960. On 20 September 1960, the functioning of the Gauhati Medical College was formally inaugurated. The first batch of the 100 students were interviewed and selected in the AMC, Dibrugarh in the last week of September 1960. Preclinical classes were started from 10 October 1960.

There was no provision for staff and students at Jalukbari. At Chandmari, about 15 km. away from Jalukbari, 73 tenements of the Industrial Housing Colony, some vacated houses of the Civil Surgeon's office, and also some vacated houses of the Engineering Institute were acquired where accommodations were provided to the staff and students who did not have their accommodations elsewhere at Guwahati. Students and staff were transported in government buses from Chandmari to Jalukbari and back. Lady students were accommodated in Ayurvedic College hostel building when available. Subsequently, two temporary barracks were also built in the Physical Education Training building at Jalukbari where second year students were accommodated while the first year students had to come as before.

The Gauhati Medical College (GMC) took its start under the stewardship of Professor I. Jahan from October 1960 to June 1961. Professor S.N. Sarma was transferred from AMC, Dibrugarh and he took over the charge of the Office of the Principal, Gauhati Medical College on 3 June 1961. Professor S.N. Sarma was the founder Principal of the Gauhati Medical College and he took great interest in the construction of the permanent college and hospital complexes. Paraclinical and clinical departments were started in the Civil Hospital Campus at Panbazar, Ulubari Maternity Home, Emigration Hospital (later on Infectious Diseases Hospital) and T.B. Hospital at Birubari, Guwahati as and when they became available. The members of the teaching staff were brought from Assam Medical College, Dibrugarh.

Due to non availability of a qualified person for professorship in SPM, the Medical Council of India permitted Dr. E. Lyngdoh, Professor of Medicine to be in-charge of the SPM department as its head. Later on Dr. A.C. Patowary took over as its head. Dr.G.C. Medhi took over as the Head of the Department of Forensic Medicine from the Civil Surgeon, Guwahati. Prof. I. Jahan was appointed as the Vice-Principal and Deputy Superintendent of the Gauhati Medical College and Hospital. Mr. Sarbananda Das was appointed as the Head Assistant of the college and Mr. Basanta Goswami became the Head Assistwnt of the hospital. When Mr. Sarbananda Das was left as secretary of the Silchar Medical College Mr. R. Nobis joined as secretary in GMC.

The government of Assam constructed the permanent buildings of the Gauhati Medical College and Hospital on the Narakachal hill. The P.W.D., government of Assam, took up the survey and started road constructions in 1962 in the Narakachal hill. The Assam Government Construction Corporation (AGCC) started building construction in February 1962. Hostels were given priority and started in the foothills of the Narakachal hill. The hostels were completed and taken over and occupied in between August 1965 and October 1966. The girls' hostel was occupied in June 1968.

B.P. Chaliha, the then Chief Minister of Assam, laid the foundation stone of the college building in the year 1963. The construction of the main college and administrative building at the Narakachal hill top could be started by the AGCC in April 1965 after the road was completed to the top by the PWD. Part by part the main college building was taken over from April 1968 to which Preclinical. Paraclinical and Central Library was shifted by August 1968. Meanwhile, the Silchar Medical College was inaugurated in its permanent building under construction at Ghungoor on 15 August 1968 and thereby the twin got separated. Dr. Rudra Goswami was put in charge of the Silchar Medical College.
In September 1968 the permanent building of the Gauhati Medical College under process of construction was inaugurated by the Governor of Assam Mr. B.K. Nehru.

On 20 September 1968 the Chief Minister of Assam Mr. B.P. Chaliha laid the foundation stone of the hospital by the side of the college main building at Narakachal hill.  However, the construction had to be abandoned because of the presence of large rocks. As stone breaking and clearing would incur massive expenditure the state government decided to shift the hospital construction to the foot hill of Narakachal. The foundation stone was laid down on 15 August 1975 by Shri Sarat Ch. Sinha, the Chief Minister of Assam. The new hospital at its permanent site at the Narakachal foot hill started functioning in 1984.

In February 1969, postgraduate courses started in Anatomy, Physiology, Biochemistry, Pathology, Pharmacology, Community Medicine, Medicine, Surgery, Ophthalmology and Otorhinolaryngology. The General Medical Council of the UK recognised the bachelor's degree of the college in 1969, thereby enabling the graduates to pursue higher studies in that country.

On 17 February 2021, a new radiation oncology block was inaugurated by Assam's health minister Himanta Biswa Sarma. It is equipped with a  topotherapy machine, making the Gauhati Medical College and Hospital the first medical college in the country with such a facility.

Courses
The university offers a -year MBBS degree, which includes a one-year internship. It also offers both degree MD/MS (3-year) and Diploma (2-year) postgraduate medical courses. DM and Mch courses are also offered.

Student activities

Junior Doctors' Association
The Junior Doctors' Association is the representative organization of the senior students along with the PG's, Internees and representatives from each Department & Batch. It consists of an Executive Body and a Working Committee consisting various members as well as representatives from the senior students. It conducts most of the Major Events in GMCH like Synchisis (College Fest), Inter College events, JDA Night, Blood Donation camps, etc. It is a major functioning body of the college and has its office in the GMCH Hospital Campus.

Students' Union
Gauhati Medical College Students Union is the representative body of the students. It was formed in 1961. Currently student politics is rather non existent in the college. The current student bodies are formed by selection and no democratic elections are held, But for the tenure 2017-18 Portfolios like President, Assistant General Secretary, Magazines Editor, Cultural Secretary, Major games Secretary, Minor games Secretary and Debating and literary Secretary were elected and For the portfolio of General Secretary, vice-president, Social service Secretary, Gymnasium Secretary were unanimously selected  without involvement of any external parties.

Notable alumni

Motiur Rohman Mondal, Politician
Ranoj Pegu, Politician

References

Affiliates of Srimanta Sankaradeva University of Health Sciences
Medical colleges in Assam
Universities and colleges in Guwahati
Educational institutions established in 1960
1960 establishments in Assam
Hospitals established in 1960